The 1971 Cal State Los Angeles Diablos football team represented California State College at Los Angeles—now known as California State University, Los Angeles—as a member of the Pacific Coast Athletic Association (PCAA) during the 1971 NCAA University Division football season. Led by first-year head coach Foster Andersen, Cal State Los Angeles compiled an overall record of 2–8 with a mark of 0–3 in conference play, placing last out of seven teams in the PCAA. This was the third straight year the Diablos had a new head coach. The team was held to a touchdown or less in eight of their ten games. For the year, they scored 90 points while allowing 269. Cal State Los Angeles played home games at the East Los Angeles College Stadium in Monterey Park, California.

Schedule

References

Cal State Los Angeles
Cal State Los Angeles Diablos football seasons
Cal State Los Angeles Diablos football